Fanaero-Chile was a Chilean aircraft manufacturer established as Fábrica Nacional de Aéronaves in 1953 at Los Cerrillos Airport, but which later moved to Rancagua. The firm developed a trainer for the Chilean Air Force, the Chincol, and although 50 were ordered, it was not able to complete the order. A prototype for a jet aircraft was abandoned when the company ceased operations in 1960.

References

 

Aircraft manufacturers of Chile
Military vehicle manufacturers
Defence companies of Chile
Chilean companies established in 1953
1960 disestablishments in Chile
Defunct companies of Chile